El Longoreño is a border town in Mexico.  It is located in the Matamoros region.  Many migrants from Mexico cross into the United States via Texas.

References 

Populated places in Tamaulipas